Meowy may refer to:

 Holly Meowy, an American actress, TV personality, model, and professional wrestling manager
 Meowy Christmas, a 1993 album by Jingle Cats

See also
 Meow (disambiguation)